Óscar González-Quevedo Bruzón (December 15, 1930 – January 9, 2019) was a Spanish-born Brazilian Jesuit priest. He was an investigator in the field of parapsychology.

Life
Quevedo was born in Madrid in a deeply Catholic family, with uncles and cousins ordained priests and a sister and a first cousin, nuns. His first cousin, Teresita González Quevedo, a Carmelite sister, is on her way to beatification (a step before becoming a saint) in the Catholic Church.

When González Quevedo was a child, an uncle, Horatio, from Gibraltar was trying to influence him with Allan Kardec's literature. At the time, Óscar and his mother Ángeles Bruzon were exiled in Gibraltar. They were escaping the Spanish Communist Republic. His father, an ardent Catholic, was martyred at the hands of the Republicans for defending Catholicism. As he was very curious and liked to read, he began to study those “amazing phenomena”, resulting in all sorts of questions and a powerful drive to study more. Several years later, conversations with the nephew changed his uncle’s beliefs in Spiritism. He has surviving family in Gibraltar as his mother was Gibraltarian.

Early in his life, he discovered his vocation to become a priest, while attending a Jesuit secondary school in Vigo, Spain.

Well equipped with a solid academic background he was ordained priest in 1961. His superior sent him to Brazil, a fertile field to research areas of superstitions, religious sects and parapsychological phenomena. His background did not lack knowledge of illusionism and magic. This was necessary to uncover all sorts of misconceptions and frauds.

He was the founder and director of the Latin American Center of Parapsychology, located in São Paulo, Brazil, where he worked on a daily basis, except while traveling domestically or throughout the world, teaching and conducting all sorts of conferences and workshops on parapsychology. González Quevedo read Latin, Greek, Hebrew, English, French and Italian, besides being fluent in Spanish and Portuguese.

Books
O que é parapsicologia
A face Oculta da Mente
As Forças Físicas da Mente
O Poder da mente na cura e na doença
Antes que os demônios voltem, Loyola
Os Espíritos e os Fenômenos Parafísicos
Há provas de que os mortos agem?
Identificação dos mortos?
As provas da ciência
Palavra de Iahweh
Nossa Senhora de Guadalupe
Milagres - A Ciência Confirma a Fé
Os Milagres e a Ciência
Milagres na história da Igreja

References

External links
Centro Latino-Americano de Parapsicologia

1930 births
2019 deaths
20th-century Brazilian Jesuits
20th-century Spanish Jesuits
Parapsychologists
Spanish emigrants to Brazil
Writers from Madrid
People from São Paulo